Events from the year 1419 in France.

Incumbents
 Monarch – Charles VI

Events
 19 January - Rouen surrenders to Henry V of England bringing Normandy under his control during the Hundred Years War
 10 September - John the Fearless, Duke of Burgundy is assassinated by his opponents. His death at the hands of supporters of the Dauphin Charles intensifies France's civil chaos.
 Unknown - John Stewart, Earl of Buchan arrives with a contingent of Scottish troops to fight on the French side during the Hundred Years War

Deaths
 10 September - John the Fearless, Duke of Burgundy (born 1371)

References

1410s in France